Muthassi is a 1971 Indian Malayalam film, directed by P. Bhaskaran and produced by Sargam Pictures. The film stars Prem Nazir, Sheela, Jose Prakash and Alummoodan in the lead roles. The film had musical score by V. Dakshinamoorthy.

Cast

Prem Nazir as Venu
Sheela as Mary/Geetha
Jose Prakash as Unnikrishnan
Alummoodan as Menon
Aranmula Ponnamma as Muthassi
Baby Rajani as Baiju
Baby Rani as Babu
Baby Sumathi as Rekha
Bahadoor as Raghavan
K. P. Ummer as Vikraman
Meena as Meenakshi
Philomina as Madhavi
Veeran as Swami
Ragini as Mary

Soundtrack
The music was composed by V. Dakshinamoorthy and the lyrics were written by P. Bhaskaran.

References

External links
 

1971 films
1970s Malayalam-language films
Films directed by P. Bhaskaran